The Toronto Transit Commission (TTC) maintains four rapid transit lines and 75 stations on  of route.

Mainline trackage

Gauge

However, the light metro Line 3 Scarborough uses standard-gauge track, as will two under-construction light rail lines: Line 5 Eglinton and Line 6 Finch West.

Tunnels
Tunnels are either square or round, depending on the method of their construction: Square tunnels were built with the cut and cover method of digging trenches down from the surface, constructing the tunnel structure, and then backfilling. Round tunnels are bored using a tunnel boring machine (TBM). The cut and cover technique was used extensively on the oldest portions of the subway system, while newer sections were predominantly or, in the case of the Toronto-York Spadina Subway Extension (TYSSE), which opened in 2017, entirely bored.

Some sections of track run on the surface, the most notable on the heavy rail subway system being the stretch of Line 1 Yonge–University in the median of Allen Road. However, the light metro Line 3 is a surface or elevated route for nearly its entire length.

Diamond crossovers
 Diamond crossovers (or "scissors crossovers") are X-shaped track assemblies that are used, particularly at terminal stations, to allow trains to reverse direction and enter the opposite track. They also exist outside some through stations (mostly those that were former terminal stations) where they are often used to short turn trains. A single-crossover just east of Union Station is what remains of the former diamond-crossover, which was used when the station marked the southern terminus of the original line. A few crossover tracks that were built as part of the original subway system have since been removed; their locations are marked by tunnel sections where there are no central pillars between tracks.

Crossovers are found in the vicinity of the following stations:

 Yonge–University line
South of Vaughan Metropolitan Centre (terminal station)
South of 
South of 
North of 
North of Bloor
South of 
South of 
South of 
 Bloor–Danforth line
East of 
East of 
East of 
 Scarborough line
East of Kennedy (on southbound track) (terminal station)
 Sheppard line
East and west of Sheppard–Yonge (terminal station)
East of 

Notes

Storage tracks or centre tracks

Centre tracks allow a train to enter from either end into a third track, longer than the length of a standard train, between the two service tracks. Trains can either layover or short turn there, allowing other trains to pass them by, or reverse direction from this position with minimal interference with through trains compared to crossovers, which requires the reversal to take place on station platforms. Sometimes, in-service trains are diverted into centre tracks when there is track maintenance on one of the service tracks. Pocket tracks are a variation on the centre track, accessible only from one end. Some storage tracks have a short stub extending beyond the convergence back to the service tracks used to store work cars. All operating centre-track structures (with the exception of Finch West station, which was partially bored and has three fully separate tunnels) were built using the cut-and-cover method, and there are support columns between the tracks. However, at the under-construction  and  stations on Line 5 Eglinton, which were "mined" rather than excavated via cut-and-cover, all three tracks are housed within single tubular, columnless tunnels.

Storage/centre tracks are found in the vicinity of the following stations:

 Yonge–University line
North of Finch West
South of 
North of 
Between  and Union
North of Eglinton (accessible from south end only)
North of Finch (third tail track)
 Bloor–Danforth line
East of Islington
East of 
West of 
 Scarborough line
There are no centre tracks or storage tracks on Line 3.
 Sheppard line
There are no centre tracks or storage tracks on Line 4.

Other track features

Track configurations become more complicated where lines meet (at the Spadina–St. George–Museum–Bay–Yonge junction and at Sheppard–Yonge), and at the entrances to subway yards.

Tracks usually continue for roughly the length of a train beyond the last station on a line; these are known as tail tracks. The only exception to this is at Don Mills station, where the tail tracks are less than two cars in length. This is likely because storage capacity is available at Sheppard–Yonge, which can store enough trains to service the line. The tail track structures at some terminal or former terminal stations also have, or have provisions for, a third tail track. Finch station has such a triple configuration, Vaughan Metropolitan Centre station is a terminal station with a trackless tunnel section for installation of a potential third tail track, and Sheppard West station was a former terminal also built with a trackless third tunnel north of it, which could now accommodate a future standard pocket track.

Other track features that exist include the following:

The Bloor Wye was used for interlining in 1966:
North of Museum station, the tracks split, with the Line 1 mainline leading west to St. George station (upper), and the other east to Bay lower (abandoned a few months later in late 1966).
The eastbound track from Bay lower joins the Bloor–Danforth line just before Yonge station while the westbound track from Bay lower turns and meets the southbound track just north of Museum station.
The eastbound tracks approaching St. George station from Spadina on the Bloor-Danforth line split, with one heading for St. George lower and the other heading for St. George upper.
The westbound track headed to Spadina station west of St. George upper now includes a switch that allows trains to run to Spadina station on the Bloor line, which was built more than a decade after the interlining trial was completed.

The tracks used for access to yards:
Single cross-overs act as entrances and exits to Keele, Wilson, and Davisville subway yards.
The Greenwood Wye between Donlands and Greenwood stations allows both east and westbound trains to route south to the Greenwood Yard.
An access track leading west to Wilson Yard south of Sheppard West station from the southbound direction, defaulting from the crossover track section leading to/from the station's northbound platform. Trains needing to access the yard from the south must reverse at the station (from either side of the island platform ) or access it from the crossover north of Wilson station.
A maintenance track, accessible from the eastbound track on the Bloor–Danforth line, just west of Warden station. Trains must run in reverse to access this siding

The Sheppard Wye includes the following features:
Northbound Yonge line to eastbound Sheppard line: track switch on the Yonge Line that meets the Sheppard line east of Sheppard–Yonge station
Westbound Sheppard line to southbound Yonge line: west of Sheppard–Yonge station on the Sheppard line storage tracks and switches allow trains to proceed from east to south connecting with the southbound Yonge line just south of Sheppard–Yonge station

Each of the three subway yards have different features that join them to the mainline. Subway operators generally get their train at a point where the yard meets the main line, at the Greenwood Portal, the Davisville Buildup (third platform of Davisville station), or the Wilson Hostler (platform-like in appearance seen heading between Wilson and Sheppard West stations on the east side of the yard) depending on the home yard.

Tracking from Union to Eglinton stations is aging and there is a proposal to upgrade trackbed from Eglinton to St. Clair stations to improve service, but could result in service interruptions.

See also

Toronto rapid transit signals

References

Trackage
4 ft 10⅞ in gauge railways